Etwatwa, also known as Holfontein, is a township near Benoni in Ekurhuleni in the Gauteng province of South Africa.  It is made up of the following sections: Etwatwa West, Quantum, Barcelona, Mkgoba, Bester Homes, Etwatwa Ext 7, Citicon, Etwatwa East, Etwatwa Ext 9, Etwatwa Ext 10, (these both known as Emaphupheni, which means land of dreams in Nguni) and Mandela. Etwatwa is also known as the last town, as it is not far from the Gauteng-Mpumalanga border to the east towards Delmas.

References

Populated places in Ekurhuleni
East Rand
Townships in Gauteng